The Maiden Tower water reservoir (Azerbaijani: Qız Qalası su anbarı) was built on the Araz river on the international border between Iran and Azerbaijan in 1999–2008. The reservoir is located 12 km below Khodaafarin reservoir. It covers the territory of Jabrayil region. From 1993 to October 18, 2020, the reservoir was under the control of the Republic of Armenia together with the hydroelectric power station of the same name. It is planned to provide 12,000 hectares of land with water through the Maiden Tower water reservoir.

History 
The main goals of building the Maiden Tower water reservoir were hydroelectric power production and irrigation. The project was developed with the agreement between the Soviet Union and Iran in October 1977. The project was completed in 1982.

On June 28, 1994-July 2, 1994 during the first official visit of the President of Azerbaijan Heydar Aliyev to Iran, a memorandum on the implementation of the project was signed.

In February 2016, the governments of Azerbaijan and Iran signed an agreement on cooperation in the field of construction, operation, use of energy and water resources of the Khodaafarin and the Maiden Tower water reservoirs.

See also 

 Khodaafarin bridges
 Jabrayil district

References 

Water supply and sanitation by country
Geography of Azerbaijan